The  Sun Temple of Modhera is a Hindu temple dedicated to the solar deity Surya located at Modhera village of Mehsana district, Gujarat, India. It is situated on the bank of the river Pushpavati. It was built after 1026-27 CE during the reign of Bhima I of the Chaulukya dynasty. No worship is offered now and is protected monument maintained by Archaeological Survey of India. The temple complex has three components: Gūḍhamanḍapa, the shrine hall; Sabhamanḍapa, the assembly hall and Kunḍa, the reservoir. The halls have intricately carved exterior and pillars. The reservoir has steps to reach the bottom and numerous small shrines.

History
The shrine proper of the Sun Temple was built during the reign of Bhima I of Chaulukya dynasty. Earlier, during 1024–1025, Mahmud of Ghazni had invaded Bhima's kingdom, and a force of around 20,000 soldiers had unsuccessfully tried to check his advance at Modhera. Historian A. K. Majumdar theorizes that the Sun Temple might have been built to commemorate this defense. On a block in western wall of cella, there is an inscription "Vikram Samvat 1083" upside down carelessly incised in Devnagari script which correspond to 1026-1027 CE. No other date is found. As the inscription is upside down, it evidences the destruction and reconstruction of the cella. Due to the position of the inscription, it is not firmly considered as the date of construction. On the stylistic ground, it is known that the Kunda with its corner shrines was built earlier at the beginning of the 11th century. The inscription is rather considered as the date of destruction by Ghazni instead of the construction. Soon after Bhima had returned to the power. So the temple proper, the miniature and the niche shrines in the tank were built shortly after 1026 CE. The dancing hall was added much later in the third quarter of the 12th century along with the gateways, the porch of the temple proper and the doorframes of the temple and the cella during the reign of the Karna.

The temple is built on 23.6° latitude (approximately near Tropic of Cancer). The place was later known as Sita ni Chauri and Ramkund locally. No worship is offered here now. The temple is the Monument of National Importance and is maintained by the Archeological Survey of India.

It was added to the tentative list of the UNESCO World Heritage Site in December 2022.

Architecture
The temple complex is built in Māru-Gurjara style (Chaulukya style). The temple complex has three axially aligned components; the shrine proper (garbhagriha) in a hall (gudhamandapa), the outer or assembly hall (sabhamandapa or rangamandapa) and a sacred reservoir (kunda).

The Sabhamandapa is not in continuation with Gudhamandapa but is placed little away as a separate structure. Both are built on a paved platform. Their roofs have collapsed long ago leaving behind a few lower-most courses. Both roofs are 15' 9" in diameter but are constructed differently. The platform or plinth is inverted lotus-shaped.

Gudhamandapa and Garbhagriha

The Gudhamandapa measures 51 feet 9 inches by 25 feet 8 inches. It is almost equally divided into Gudhamandapa, the hall and Garbhgriha, the shrine proper. Both are rectangular in plan with one projection on each of the smaller sides and two projections on each of the longer sides. These projections on the smaller sides form the entrance and the back of the shrine. The three projections of the outer wall of Gudhamandapa had windows on each side and the east projection had the doorway. These windows had perforated stone screens; the northern is in ruins and the southern is missing. Pradakshinamarga is formed by the passage between the walls of Garbhgriha and the outer walls of Gudhamandapa. The roof of passage has stones slabs carved with rosettes. The Shikhara of it no longer exists.

Garbhagriha
The Garbhagriha, the shrine proper or sanctum sanctorum is square measuring 11 feet from inside.

The shrine had two cells; a cell below the level of the upper cell. The floor of the upper cell is now fallen which once housed the image of a deity. The seat of the image is now in a pit. The lower cell was probably used for storage.

The walls inside the shrine are plain and the outer wall is decorated. The doorway has carved figures of seated Surya in panels surrounded by dancers and amorous couples. All figures are mutilated and the images on the door-lintel are completely destroyed.

The sanctum sanctorum is designed in a way that the first rays of rising sun lit up the image of Surya during solar equinox days and on summer solstice day, the sun shines directly above the temple at noon casting no shadow.

Gudhamandapa

Base moldings
The outer walls of the shrine is highly decorated.
The base and walls of the shrine and hall are divided into several stretches with unique carvings. the Pitha or adhisthana, the base has the two square members called Bhat followed by a cyma recta carving (lower part convex and upper part concave). It is followed by padma or padmaka, the molding in form of an inverted lotus. The next is antarita, a fillet or an astragal with a sharp edge between two recesses. Above this is patta having thin molding called chhaja at its lower edge. The next is another chhaja separated by neck, alinga. The next broad band, patti, is gajathara carved with elephants. The following band narathara has figures of men in different attitudes.

Mandovara or wall moldings
Mandovara, the wall moldings start with kumbha, a pitcher. It has a broad undecorated band at the lower part while the middle part is decorated with oval discs. It is followed by kalasha, a pitcher. The next is a broad band with chaitya-windows called kevala followed by similar called manchi. These two bands are separated by a deep band. There is a thin fillet above which the major paneled face of the wall called jangha exist. These panels are decorated with figures of gods but the figures of Surya are placed prominently than others as the temple is dedicated to him. Other panels are decorated with dancers and other figures.

The figures of Surya are prominently carved on three niches of shrine proper as well as on each side of three windows in the outer wall of Gudhamandapa. The figures of Surya is in standing position with two arms holding lotuses and driven by seven horses. It has some Persian influences. The walls have 12 niches showing the different aspects of Surya in each month. Other figures include eight Dikpals, Vishwakarma, Varuna, Agni, Ganesha, Saraswati.

Every figure in the panel has a small cornice over it surmounted with a triangular pediment consisting of chaitya-a window which is called udgam. The next projecting band with chaitya-window and kirtimukha is called malakval. The topmost is the major cornice called chhajli.

This is followed by shikhara which no longer exist. The Vimana had horizontal geometrical and figurative bands which rising to create the Mount Meru-like shikhara. The central spire had Urushringa, the miniature shrines. It is judged by the shrines on the steps of Kunda.

Mandapa
The Mandapa, a hall was roofed by a dome which probably rose in a concentric manner. It is supported by eight principal pillars below arranged in an octagon, four pillars in front of shrine proper and two each in the recesses of windows and door.

Sabhamandapa

Sabhamandapa or Rangamandapa, the assembly hall or dancing hall is parallelogram in plan with rows of pillars opening entrance on each side diagonally. The extensively carved exterior has a series of recessed corners giving an impression of the star-like plan of it. There are 52 intricately carved pillars. Madhusudan Dhaky has suggested that the sabhamandapa may have been later addition based on style and construction.

Base moldings
The pitha is almost similar to the Gudhamandapa but smaller as two courses of fillets are omitted. The padma is carved richly here with floral ornamentation.

Wall moldings
Above the Narathara, there is a band with figures of dancers and gods known as rajasena. The next is vedi which correspond to jangha of mandovara decorated with large panels of gods, goddesses, and floral designs. The next is cornice called asinot. It followed by kakshasana which slopes outwards and forms the back-rests of the bench, asana which runs around the hall. There are erotic figures on it interrupted by rail-patterns.

Ceiling and torana
The roof was in shape of the stepped pyramid but it no longer exists. Inside, the walnut-shaped ceiling rises in tiers which has numerous floral girdles. It is 23 feet high. It is supported by pillars arranged in an octagon. These pillars have stilts that support the lintels. Torana or the decorated cusped arches arise from the lower brackets of the pillars and touch the lintels in middle. There are two types; semicircular and triangular. The semicircular arches have cusped arches with tips while triangular arches have a round apex and wavy sides. Both types have a broad band decorated with figures and tips which are now defaced and damaged. The lower brackets has Makara which gives the name of Makara-Torana while decoration gives name of chitra-torana.

Pillars

The pillars of Sabhamandapa and Gudhamandapa are of two types; short and tall. The short pillars rest on the walls and support the roof. The tall pillars rise from the floor.

Short pillars
The shaft is square in shape to half of its height followed by the vase and then followed by an octagonal shaft. It is surmounted by a capital and a bracket. The square part has a floral design in a circle on each side of the face. The vase is decorated similarly on its corners. The octagonal part has four bands; the topmost has kirtimukha.  The capital has three annulets.

Tall pillars
They arise from square or octagonal base, kumbhi, with triangular ornamentation on each face. Above it is kalasha. It is followed by a deep band and the next is kevala decorated with chaitya-windows. the next is kirtimukha. The next is triangular pediment with chaitya-windows.

The next is the beginning of the shaft. It is first decorated with standing figures, mostly dancers, on all eight faces enclosed in ringed pilasters. The next band with scenes of men and beasts is separated from it by the round pillow-like band. It is followed by a still smaller band with sixteen standing human figures separated by small annulet below. The next is a band of leaves. Then the shaft becomes circular and had three or four bands having a row of male warriors, lozenges, circles and kirtimukha at last. The kirtimukhas are separated by chain and bell ornamentation.

It follows capital similar to small pillars crowned with makara brackets if eight stilted pillar and dwarfs in the rests. the eight stilted pillars have one more shaft and similar type of capital which is crowned with brackets of volutes and pendant leaves.

Iconography
The panels on the Gudhamandapa is decorated with Surya centrally which indicates that the temple is dedicated to Surya. These images wears peculiar West Asian (Persian) boots and belt. The other corners and niches are decorated with figures of Shiva and Vishnu in various forms, Brahma, Nāga and goddesses. The depicted scenes on small flat ceilings and lintels of sabhamandapa are from epics like Ramayana.

Kirti-torana
There was a kirti-torana, the triumphant arch, in front of sabhamandapa. The pediment and torana no longer exists but two pillars remains. The moulding and decoration is similar to that of walls of sabhamandapa and pillars. There were two more kirti-torana on each side of the kunda of which only one exists without upper part.

Kunda

Kunda, a tank or reservoir is known as Ramakunda or Suryakunda. The flight of steps through kirti-torana leads to the reservoir. It is rectangular. It measures 176 feet from north to south and 120 feet from east to west. It is paved with stones all around. There are four terraces and recessed steps to descend to reach the bottom of the tank. The main entrance lies on west. There are steps to reach from one terrace to another on right angle to terrace. These steps are rectangular or square except the first step of each flight of steps which is semicircular. Several miniature shrines and niches in front of terrace-wall have images of gods including many Vaishnavite deities and goddesses such as Shitala.

Stepwell
The stepwell on the west of Kunda has one entrance and two pavilion-towers. It is moderately ornamented. The door-frame has lotus and leaves and the ruchaka type pilasters indicate it belongs to 11th century. The small mandapa above the ground level and located on the second kuta of stepwell may belong to tenth century.

Modhera dance festival

The Tourism Corporation of Gujarat organises an annual three-day dance festival known as Uttarardha Mahotsav at the temple during the third week of January, following the festival of Uttarayan. The objective is to present classical dance forms in an atmosphere similar to that in which they were originally presented.

In popular culture

Letitia Elizabeth Landon's poetical illustration Hindoo and Mahommedan Buildings refers to a coloured engraving of "a splendid sculptured Portico of a Temple dedicated to Mahadeo, at Moondheyra in Guzerat" and in it she meditates upon the vastness of this structure. The original painting is by David Roberts.

Gallery

See also
Becharaji
Patan, Gujarat

Notes and references

Notes

References

Further reading
 
 Surya: The God and His Abode, Parijat, 2010, 
Burgess, Jas & Cousens, Henry, The Architectural Antiquities of Northern Gujarat, Bharatiya Publishing House, Varanasi, 1975
Brown Percy, Indian Architecture (Buddhist and Hindu Periods), D.B. Taraporewala Sons & Co. Ltd. Bombay, 1975
Sankalia, Hasmukh. D., The Archaeology of Gujarat (Including Katiawar), Natwarlal & Co. Publishers, Bombay, 1941
Majumdar, Ashok Kumar, Chaulukyas of Gujarat, Bharatiya Vidya Bhawan, 1956.

External links

Hindu temples in Gujarat
Surya temples
History of Gujarat
Destroyed Hindu temples
Religious buildings and structures completed in 1026
11th-century Hindu temples
Cultural history of Gujarat
Tourist attractions in Mehsana district
Monuments of National Importance in Gujarat
Māru-Gurjara architecture
World Heritage Tentative List for India